The 7th Golden Bell Awards was held on 25 March 1971 at the Zhongshan Hall in Taipei, Taiwan. The ceremony was hosted by Wang Hong-jun.

Winners

References

1971
1971 in Taiwan